Aciculitins are antifungal cyclic peptides isolated from a marine sponge. There are 3 Aciculitins that are isolated from the Lithistid sponge Aciculites orientalis that differ by their homologous lipid residues.

Aciculitin D is a similar cyclic peptide to Aciculitin A-C. It was isolated from Poecillastra sp. marine sponge that is collected from the deep sea. Based on its molecular formula, Aciculitin D is the most similar to Aciculitin B structure wise since they only differ in one amino acid substitution. The structure of Aciculitin B contains one extra glutamine while the structure of Aciculitin D has one extra L-Threonine. Although the two cyclic peptides contain slightly different amino acids, they still have the same overall charge because both glutamine and L-Threonine are considered neutral amino acids.

Cytotoxicity 
Aciculitin A-C exhibits cytotoxicity against human colon tumor cell line HCT-116 with IC50 value of 0.5 µg/mL. 

Aciculitin D exhibits cytotoxicity against human colon tumor cell line HCT-116 with IC50 value of 0.51 µM. Aciculitin D also exhibits cytotoxicity against HeLa, human cervical cells with IC50 value of 0.57 µM.

Further reading
Otero‐Gonzáiez, A. J., Magalhaes, B. S., Garcia‐Villarino, M., López‐Abarrategui, C., Sousa, D. A., Dias, S. C., & Franco, O. L. (2010). Antimicrobial peptides from marine invertebrates as a new frontier for microbial infection control. The FASEB journal, 24(5), 1320-1334. https://www.ncbi.nlm.nih.gov/pubmed/20065108

References

Cyclic peptides